Table tennis competition has been in the Summer Olympic Games since 1988, with singles and doubles events for men and women. Athletes from China have dominated the sport, winning a total of 60 medals in 37 events, including 32 out of a possible 37 gold medals, and only failing to win at least one medal in one event, the inaugural Men's Singles event at the 1988 Summer Olympics.

Summary

Events
In 1992 (only), two bronze medals were awarded in each event. In 2008, the doubles events were replaced by team events to lessen the emphasis on doubles play. Chinese table tennis team won 8 medals and made podium sweeps on the men's and woman's singles events at the 2008 Summer Olympics. Due to China's dominance in the sport, the format was changed for the 2012 Olympics so that each NOC may enter up to two competitors in singles events. With gender equality a big focus, mixed doubles event became one of the nine new mixed-gender events at the 2020 Summer Olympics.

Medal table

Sources:

Number of athletes by nation
In addition to independent Olympians and the Unified Team in 1992, athletes from 104 NOCs had competed in the Olympic table tennis tournaments.

Winners

Men's singles

Women's singles

Men's doubles

Women's doubles

Mixed doubles

Men's team

Women's team

See also
List of Olympic venues in table tennis
List of naturalised Olympic table tennis players from China
Table tennis at the Summer Paralympics
Table tennis at the Youth Olympic Games

References

 
Sports at the Summer Olympics
Olympics